Survivor: South Pacific is the twenty-third season of the American CBS competitive reality television series Survivor. The season was filmed from May 30 through July 7, 2011 and premiered on September 14, 2011. Applications were due on January 11, 2011, approximately 800 applicants visited in various states, from there 16 contestants were chosen as participants.

Samoa was not initially selected as a location for this season, as the show had already filmed two seasons (Samoa and Heroes vs. Villains) in the area. The production team withdrew from their original locale, Tonga, due to economic problems. The season was filmed in the vicinity of Upolu and it served as the location for the next season and this was the third season to be filmed in the country, tied with Panama. Redemption Island, first introduced in the prior season, returned for this season.

Sophie Clarke was named the winner in the final episode on December 18, 2011, defeating Benjamin "Coach" Wade and Albert Destrade in a 6–3–0 vote. Ozzy Lusth won $100,000 as the "Sprint Player of the Season", winning this honor by the largest margin since the award's inception in Survivor: China, and earning the fans' vote over John Cochran.

Contestants
This season features 16 new Survivor contestants and two returning players: Ozzy Lusth from Cook Islands and Micronesia, and Benjamin "Coach" Wade from Tocantins and Heroes vs. Villains. Shane Powers of Panama was contacted, however he declined and was replaced by Lusth. Notable contestants include Brandon Hantz, nephew of three-time Survivor contestant Russell Hantz; country singer Whitney Duncan, a finalist on the fifth season of Nashville Star; and beauty queen and dancer Elyse Umemoto, who was Miss Washington 2007 and 2nd runner-up at Miss America 2008.

The players were initially split into two tribes of nine, each with one returning player: Savaii and Upolu, named after the two main islands of the independent nation of Samoa. When the tribes were merged into one, they chose to name their new tribe Te Tuna, after a Samoan legend about the origins of the coconut tree.

Future appearances
Brandon Hantz, John Cochran, and Dawn Meehan returned for Survivor: Caramoan. Jim Rice and Mikayla Wingle were included on the public poll to choose the cast of Survivor: Cambodia, but neither was chosen to compete. Ozzy Lusth played for a fourth time on Survivor: Game Changers. Cochran also made a special appearance in the fifth episode of Game Changers, where he gave advice to a contestant who was exiled. Sophie Clarke returned to compete on Survivor: Winners at War.

Outside of Survivor, Edna Ma appeared on the fifth season of ABC's Shark Tank to secure funding for her product "BareEASE". Whitney Duncan and Keith Tollefson have since married; while engaged, they competed as a team for The Amazing Race 25. Wingle competed with Survivor: Pearl Islands castaway Ryan Opray on the Amazon Prime Video series World's Toughest Race: Eco-Challenge Fiji as part of Team Peak Traverse.

Season summary
Sixteen new castaways, previously divided into two tribes, Savaii and Upolu, were joined by returning contestants, Oscar "Ozzy" Lusth and Benjamin "Coach" Wade, with Ozzy joining Savaii and Coach joining Upolu by random draw.  Redemption Island was again in play: voted out players would be sent to Redemption Island and participate in duels, with the winner remaining there until either the next duel or until two specific points where players were brought back into the game.

Both tribes rallied under the leadership of Ozzy and Coach. Ozzy's style was somewhat more aggressive, establishing a rift between the majority of his alliance and others, specifically the weaker Cochran. Coach, having reflected on his past performances on Survivor, had a more open style, which most of the group readily followed, including Brandon, who later revealed himself to be the nephew of former Survivor castaway Russell Hantz, and had feared revealing this lest he draw his tribe's ire. Both Ozzy and Coach found their tribes' respective Hidden Immunity Idols.

The two tribes fared equally at challenges and retained similar numbers, and as they approached the perceived merge, Ozzy offered a plan to volunteer to be voted to go to Redemption Island, where he would likely win the challenge over Christine, a former Upolu member, assuring that the tribes would be equal at six members each when merged.  This plan went as expected, and the newly merged tribe named themselves Te Tuna. However, Savaii's former rash behavior to Cochran was seen as an opportunity by the former Upolu members, and they were able to turn Cochran to their side on the first vote after the merge, voting out former Savaii member Keith. The Upolu members and Cochran would continue to dominate at Tribal Council, sending the remaining Savaii members to Redemption Island, starting with Ozzy, who dominated at Redemption Island subsequently.

With no other Savaii members remaining, Cochran was voted out next, followed by Upolu outsider Edna. In the subsequent challenge, Brandon won immunity but offered it to his closest ally Albert, who was the intended target of the vote. Brandon was voted out instead and defeated by Ozzy the next day at the final Redemption duel. Ozzy returned to the game and won the subsequent challenge; at Tribal Council, Sophie broke down into tears but affirmed her commitment to the game, and Rick was voted off. In the final immunity challenge between Coach, Ozzy, Sophie, and Albert, Sophie was narrowly able to defeat Ozzy; she and her former Upolu members voted off Ozzy for the third and final time. Coach, Albert, and Sophie faced the final Tribal Council, where Coach was criticized for manipulating his tribe while simultaneously preaching the importance of honor and Albert was considered to have given his former tribe members false hope. The jury awarded Sophie the title of Sole Survivor over Coach and Albert in a 6–3–0 vote, respectively.

In the case of multiple tribes or castaways who win reward or immunity, they are listed in order of finish, or alphabetically where it was a team effort; where one castaway won and invited others, the invitees are in brackets.

Episodes

Voting history

Reception

While not to the extent of its predecessor, Survivor: South Pacific was generally panned by the time it ended, with the primary criticism being the return of the Redemption Island twist. Dalton Ross of Entertainment Weekly criticized the season's "same twist of two returning players, Redemption Island, the predictable vote-offs, and no real water challenges," but reserved some praise for several of the cast members, including Cochran and Brandon. Ross ultimately ranked the season 21st out of 40 (as of May 2020). In 2014, Joe Reid of The Wire ranked it as the 5th-worst season, criticizing both of the returning players as continuing "their already tedious tendencies towards self-aggrandizement and shoddy strategy." In 2020, it was ranked as the 5th-worst season by Survivor fan site "The Purple Rock Podcast", saying that "there were so many unlikable people that you almost forget about the enjoyable ones." They also criticized the two returning players as mostly "terrible choices, and the Redemption Island gimmick was every bit as much of a failure here as it was the first time it was used." Another prominent fan site, "Survivor Oz", ranked it as the 6th-worst season in its first annual poll ranking all seasons of the series in 2012, and thus originally considered it to be the best post-Heroes vs. Villains season at the time; however, in both 2013 and 2014, South Pacific dropped on the list and was consistently ranked as the second-worst season, only ahead of its predecessor, Survivor: Redemption Island. In 2015, a poll by Rob Has a Podcast ranked South Pacific as the 6th-worst season with Rob Cesternino ranking this season 18th out of 30 seasons. This was updated in 2021 during Cesternino's podcast, Survivor All-Time Top 40 Rankings, ranking 29th. In 2020, Inside Survivor ranked this season 30th out of 40 saying that the season's "dull endgame ultimately prevents it from being a great season of Survivor. Still, its memorable characters help elevate it above the other 'Dark Age' seasons that came before and after it."

References

External links
 Official CBS Survivor South Pacific Website

23
2011 American television seasons
2011 in Samoa
Television shows filmed in Samoa